Elisa de Ménerville (born 1768; fl. 1797) was a French memoir writer.  She is known for her memoirs, describing her life during the French Revolution.   

She was born to the banker Jean Fougeret and philanthrophist Anne-Françoise de Fougeret, sister of the memoirist Anguelique de Maussion, and married to a nobleman. 

Her memoirs describe her life in exile in the Austrian Netherlands (1791-1793), the Dutch Republic and London (1794-1797); they are representative for noblewomen in exile during the revolution, but give an unusual description of the working life of female exiles in the London emigré community.

References

1768 births
Year of death unknown

People of the French Revolution
French memoirists
18th-century memoirists
18th-century French women writers
18th-century travel writers
French women memoirists